Over the years Chicago has been called home by many immigrant groups and cultures,  the Welsh included.

The Welsh in the early history of Chicago
Thomas Jefferson Vance Owen, whose grandparents were from Wales, is considered "The True Founder of Chicago". He became the first president of the town of Chicago in 1833, and is responsible for sub-dividing the city into sections and towns.  In fact, in early Chicago history, some of the city's mayors were of close Welsh heritage, including:

Buckner Stith Morris 1838–39
Alexander Loyd 1840–41
John P. Hopkins 1893–95

Welsh street names in Chicago

Chicago has a few street names which owe their heritage to Wales. They include Berwyn Avenue and Bryn Mawr Avenue. These streets in the city's Edgewater neighborhood were named for stations on the Pennsylvania Railroad's Main Line, located in towns named for Welsh places.

Welsh town and city names in Illinois

Some Illinois towns are named directly after towns in Wales, for their Welsh founders or prominent Welsh Americans, including: Berwyn, Cambria, Cardiff, Edwardsville, Evanston, St. David & Swansea.

The Chicago Eisteddfod of 1893

Aiming to match the grand scale of the World's Fair, the Welsh mounted an International Eisteddfod, a competitive literary and music festival, on the Fair grounds. Choral performances reportedly drew crowds of 6,000 to the Festival Hall. Clara Novello Davies took her Welsh Ladies Choir to Chicago and won the heat for ladies' choirs against competition from Scranton, Wilkes-Barre, Salt Lake City and Ohio.

Prominent Welsh expatriates in Chicago – past and present
 Dr. Anthony Jones – President of the School of the Art Institute of Chicago from 1983 to 2007.
 Nicholas Rudall – Head of the Classic Department, University of Chicago (retired 2007).
 Jon Langford – The lead singer of the Chicago-based band The Waco Brothers.
 Elia Einhorn – The lead singer of the Chicago-based band Scotland Yard Gospel Choir.
 Christopher Mander – The Midwest Regional Manager of the Intercontinental hotel chain, a supporter of a number of local charities and was a consultant for the Chicago's 2016 Olympics bid committee. (retired 2008).
 Steve Morgan – Head of foreign media relations for the Barack Obama's 2008 presidential campaign.
 Father Jeremy Thomas – Pastor at St. Jerome Parish in Chicago.
 In 1984, Welsh athlete Steve Jones won the Chicago Marathon, coming in at 2:08:05 and thus breaking the world record of Australian Robert de Castella by 13 seconds.
 Jack Evans (ice hockey) – from Garnant, Wales, played for The Chicago Blackhawks 1958 to 1963. 
 Cy Thomas – Dowlais Wales, played for The Chicago Blackhawks 1947/48.
 Wilf Cude – from Barry, played for The Chicago Blackhawks 1931/1932.
 Reverend Elam Davies – The longtime notorious minister of the 4th Presbyterian church in Chicago. In 1979 Time magazine called him one of the top 7 star preachers in the US.
 David Charles Davies – Originally from Llangeitho was the Director of Chicago's Field Museum of Natural History from December 19, 1921, to July 14, 1928.
 Jenkin Lloyd Jones – Welsh Unitarian minister who founded All Souls Unitarian Church in Chicago, Illinois, as well as its community outreach organization, the Abraham Lincoln Centre.

Welsh-American Chicagoans
Chicagoans of Welsh descent have made their presence known in many arenas of entertainment and public service. To name a few: Secretary of State Senator Hillary Rodham Clinton, comedian and actor Robin Williams, Chicago news reporter and host of 190 North Janet Davies, actress Denise Richards and architect Frank Lloyd Wright.

Chicago Alderman Brian K. Hopkins of the 2nd Ward, has Welsh paternal ancestry from both Aberdare, Glamorganshire and Llangurig, Montgomeryshire.

Chicago’s most infamous son of Wales is probably Murray the Hump, Al Capone’s chief lieutenant. Once America’s Public Enemy Number One, he was born in Chicago to Welsh parents from Llanidloes, Mid-Wales.

Present Welsh ties
Expatriated Welshmen continue to contribute to Chicago’s culture. Chicago is also home to three vibrant Welsh societies: The Chicago Tafia Welsh Society, The Welsh Women’s Club of Illinois and The Cambrian Benevolent Society of Chicago, catering to every facet of Welsh culture past and present. Welsh musicians often visit Chicago to perform; most recently: The Manic Street Preachers, The Joy Formidable, Marina and the Diamonds, Duffy, The Stereophonics, Jem, Cerys Matthews, Jon Langford, Bryn Terfel, Tom Jones, People in Planes, Future of the Left, Katherine Jenkins, Super Furry Animals, Funeral for a Friend, Goldie Lookin Chain, Here Be Dragons, David Llewellyn, Julian Jones & The Brit Bus Tour, numerous Welsh male voice choirs and authors Niall Griffiths, Fflur Dafydd, Aeronwy Thomas & Janet Quin-Harkin aka Rhys Bowen.

In 2007 the Illinois General Assembly signing into law Bill HR0149 that proclaimed March 1, 2007, and each year thereafter, as St. David's Day in the State of Illinois and recognizing the Welsh contribution to the state.

In 2008 Chicago was chosen as the host city for the North American Festival of Wales, the largest Welsh festival in North America.

On Saturday June 6, 2009 the United States national rugby union team played Wales in an international friendly at Toyota Park in Bridgeview, Illinois.

Since 2009, Chicago's iconic Wrigley Building has been illuminated on March 1 in the Welsh national colours (white, red & green) to honour St. David's Day.

On Sunday June 6, 2010 the cult independent Welsh film A Bit of Tom Jones? received its North American premiere in Chicago.

On March 1, 2018, four Chicago area buildings (The Wrigley Building, Two Prudential Plaza, The InterContinental Hotel and the Ferris Wheel at Navy Pier) illuminated red, white & green to celebrate St. David's Day.

In 2019, members of The Chicago Tafia Welsh Society partnered with the Pleasant House Pub in Pilsen to paint a Cofiwch Dryweryn mural inside the pub. The mural has been featured in a Cofiwch Dryweryn book by Y Lolfa and in a documentary by S4C.

St. David's Episcopal Church in suburban Aurora contains a cornerstone of gray Cambrian limestone, shipped from Saint David’s Cathedral in Wales, which was laid and sealed on the eve of Saint David’s Day, February 28, 1959.  A box inside the cornerstone holds, among other items, a note from the stonedresser in Pembrokeshire, Wales.

See also

 Chicago Welsh Societies

References

Further reading
 Monaghan, Jay. The Welsh People in Chicago – Illinois State Historical Society Journal 32. 1939.
 
 Edwards, Hywel Teifi. Eisteddfod Ffair y Byd: Chicago, 1893.
 Hartmann, Edward G. Americans from Wales.
 The untold story of the rise and tragic fall of a US mining town called Cardiff.
 Chicago lights up in colours of Welsh flag for St David's Day

External links
 Encyclopedia of Chicago – Welsh
 International Eisteddfod chair, Chicago, 1893
 Eisteddfod Ffair y Byd Chicago, 1893
 Full text of Illinois House Resolution HR0149 proclaiming St. David's Day and the Welsh contribution to the State of Illinois
 Chicago marks St. David's Day with Welsh colors atop iconic Wrigley Building 
 The Newport man who played for Obama (Chicago native Jon Langford)
 Q&A: Inaugration Eve with Jon Langford
 Marchnata canu'r Cymry yn Chicago (Article in Welsh from BBC Wales)
 Statistics showing Kaneville, Illinois ranking among the U.S. cities with the highest percentages of people of Welsh ancestry as reported in the 2000 census.
 BBC article St David's Day – Chicago Style
 Article about Cardiff, Illinois
 History of Swansea, Illinois
 History of Edwardsville, Illinois
 History of Evansville, Illinois
 Press Statement from Secretary of State Hillary Rodham Clinton – St. David's Day 2010

 
Ethnic groups in Chicago